"Orange Sky" is a song from Alexi Murdoch's EP Four Songs. The re-recorded version of the song is also included on Murdoch's first album Time Without Consequence.

Uses in other media
The song was featured in the movie Garden State, although it was not released on the soundtrack for the film, as well as the movie Ladder 49. It was also included in episodes of the television shows Dawson's Creek, The O.C., Prison Break, House, Brothers & Sisters, Suburgatory  and Ugly Betty. "Orange Sky" has also been featured in commercials for the Honda Element and for Hallmark Cards.  It was used again in the trailer for the film Paradise Now in 2005.  Director Josh Lowell also used it for several sequences in the climbing video Pilgrimage featuring Chris Sharma. In 2009, NBC used the song in advertisements for the cop drama Southland.  The song was also featured in the 2009 movie, Away We Go.
In 2019, Kat Cunning covered the song. The version was then featured in the Soundtrack of  Looking for Alaska (miniseries), a show based on the novel by John Green.

Orange Sky Laundry, a service offering free clothes washing for the homeless in Australia, was named for the song.

Personnel

Four Songs
Alexi Murdoch – Vocals, Guitar, Slide Guitar
Chad Fischer – Drums
Andrew Bush – Bass
Jay Bellerose – Cymbal
Joel Shearer – Electric Guitar
Renee Stahl – Backing Vocals

Time Without Consequence
Alexi Murdoch  Harmonium, Guitar, Piano, Tambourine
Brett Simons – Bass  
Greg Leisz – Guitar
Joel Shearer – Guitar 
Jay Bellerose – Percussion
Ben Peeler – Lap Steel Guitar
Savanna Talbot – Backing Vocals

References

External links

2003 songs
Song recordings produced by Chad Fischer